Yu Ziyang (simplified Chinese: 于子洋; born 23 May 1998) is a male Chinese table tennis player.

References

Chinese male table tennis players
1998 births
Living people
People from Dongying
Table tennis players from Shandong
Universiade gold medalists for China
Universiade medalists in table tennis
Medalists at the 2017 Summer Universiade
Medalists at the 2019 Summer Universiade